Shakrain Festival (also known as Kite festival and Ghuri Utsob) is an annual celebration in Dhaka, Bangladesh, observed with the flying of kites. 
It occurs at the end of Poush, the ninth month of the Bengali calendar (January 14 or 15 in Gregorian calendar). This day is known as Poush Sangkranti (End of Poush).

Shakrain Festival is one of the oldest annual festivals of Bangladesh. It  is a famous and a significant event in Bangladeshi culture.  It is the symbol of unity and friendship in Bangladesh.

Events
Shakrain is celebrated mostly around the southern part of Dhaka city.
As part of the celebration, colourful kites are flown high from the rooftops around the area in the afternoon. 
It often takes the form of kite fighting, in which participants try to snag each other's kites or cut other kites down.

When night falls, fireworks light up the sky of old Dhaka. Flame-eaters also gather on the roofs to entertain people with their skills of manipulating fire.
Music awakens the whole town, while people keep dancing from their hearts.
Bringing thousands of people together to compete and have fun, it is an occasion and a day every youngsters wait eagerly for.

Gallery

See also
Makar Sankranti
International Kite Festival in Gujarat – Uttarayan
Lohri

References

Old Dhaka
Festivals of Bangladeshi culture
Kite festivals
Cultural festivals in Bangladesh
Spring festivals
Festivals in Dhaka
Sports festivals in Asia